Union Township is one of the fourteen townships of Carroll County, Ohio, United States. As of the 2020 census, the population was 868.

Geography
Located in the south central part of the county, it borders the following townships:
Center Township - northeast
Lee Township - east
Perry Township - south
Orange Township - southwest corner
Monroe Township - west
Harrison Township - northwest

No municipalities are located in Union Township.

Name and history
It is one of twenty-seven Union Townships statewide.  It was named Union because it was formed as a union from more than one previous townships.

Government

The township is governed by a three-member board of trustees, who are elected in November of odd-numbered years to a four-year term beginning on the following January 1. Two are elected in the year after the presidential election and one is elected in the year before it. There is also an elected township fiscal officer, who serves a four-year term beginning on April 1 of the year after the election, which is held in November of the year before the presidential election. Vacancies in the fiscal officership or on the board of trustees are filled by the remaining trustees.

Education
Students attend the Carrollton Exempted Village School District.

References

External links
County website

Townships in Carroll County, Ohio
Townships in Ohio